Bulinus barthi is a species of small tropical freshwater snail with a sinistral shell, an aquatic gastropod mollusk in the family Planorbidae, the ramshorn snails and their allies.

This species is found in Kenya and Tanzania; its natural habitat is swamps.

References

Bulinus
Gastropods described in 1979
Molluscs of Kenya
Invertebrates of Tanzania
Taxonomy articles created by Polbot